De grens  (English:The border) is a 1984 Dutch thriller film directed by Leon de Winter. It was screened in the Un Certain Regard section at the 1984 Cannes Film Festival.

Cast
 Johan Leysen - Hans Deitz
 Linda van Dyck - Marleen Ruyter
 Angela Winkler - Rosa Clement
 André Dussollier - Marcel Boas
 Héctor Alterio - Andras Menzo
 Mariana Rey Monteiro - Sabino's mother
 Cecília Guimarães - Pensionhoudster
 Paula Guedes - Ondervraagster
 Isabel Ribeiro - Marcel's wife
 José María Blanco
 Rui Cardoso
 Rosa Clement
 Hans Deitz
 Helena Isabel

References

External links 
 

Dutch thriller films
1984 films
1980s Dutch-language films
1984 thriller films
Films directed by Leon de Winter